Industrial Training Institute, Midnapore known as Govt ITI Midnapore. This Institute established in 1967,  is one of the oldest government vocational training institute located in Rangamati, Midnapore,  West Bengal. This ITI offers different training courses on Carpenter, Electrician, Fitter, Foundryman, Machinist, Turner, Welder, Wireman, Sheet Metal Worker.

References

External links

ITI Midnapore 

Educational institutions established in 1967
1967 establishments in West Bengal
Industrial Training Institute (ITI) in West Bengal